The Subprefecture of Vila Mariana is one of 32 subprefectures of the city of São Paulo, Brazil.  It comprises three districts: Vila Mariana, Saúde, and Moema.

The Ibirapuera Park is located in this subprefecture, as well as the main campus of Federal University of São Paulo and the Brazilian headquarters of IBM.

References

Subprefectures of São Paulo